Renzo da Ceri, true name Lorenzo dell'Anguillara (1475 or 1476 – January 1536) was an Italian condottiero. He was a member of the Anguillara family.

Born in Ceri, a small village in Lazio (now part of Cerveteri), he was the son of Giovanni degli Anguillara.

He fought for the Orsini family against the Papal States and Cesare Borgia. In 1503 he was hired by Spain and took part to the Battle of Garigliano of that year. In 1507 he was at the service of Julius II.

In 1510 he fought for the Republic of Venice in the Italian Wars. He defeated Silvio Savelli but was in turn beat by Prospero Colonna, whom he had harassed during the siege of Crema. In 1523 he attacked Rubiera and Reggio Emilia.

He led Clement VII's troops in his feudal war against the Colonna family and was present at the Sack of Rome (1527).

Renzo da Ceri died following a fall from his horse in 1536.

References
Pietro Balan, Clemente VII e l'Italia dei suoi tempi, 1887, Florence
Paolo Giovio, Vitae illustrum virorum, 1549, Florence

1470s births
1536 deaths
People from Cerveteri
16th-century condottieri
Deaths by horse-riding accident in Italy